Jazz Hostels is one of the largest hostel chains in the USA.  Established in 1998 with Jazz on the Park Hostel in New York City, the company continues to evolve, with four hostels in New York City, two in Montreal and one in South Beach, Miami. They have also expanded internationally with partner properties in Melbourne and Cairns.

See also
 Hostel
 Backpacking (travel)

References

External links
 Official Website
 In Hostel Basement, Newcomer Sets Sights Far Up the Ladder

Hostels